Inverness Caledonian Thistle F.C. in their 12th season in Scottish football competing in the Scottish Premier League, Scottish League Cup and the Scottish Cup in season 2005–06.

Results

Scottish Premier League

Final League table

Scottish League Cup

Scottish Cup

References
caleythistleonline

Inverness Caledonian Thistle F.C. seasons
Inverness